Frank J. Paterson was an Australian surveyor and mayor of Toowoomba, Queensland from 1931 to 1933.

References

Australian surveyors
Mayors of Toowoomba
Year of birth missing
Year of death missing